Rice's Crossing is an unincorporated community located six miles southwest of Taylor in Williamson County, Texas. Settled in 1845 and originally called Blue Hill, the community was renamed Rice's Crossing in 1872 in honor of James O. Rice, a Texas Ranger and early settler.

References

Unincorporated communities in Texas
Unincorporated communities in Williamson County, Texas
Populated places established in 1845
1845 establishments in the Republic of Texas